Khánh Ly (born as Nguyễn Thị Lệ Mai; 6 March 1945 in Hanoi) is a Vietnamese-American singer. She performed many songs written by Vietnamese composer Trịnh Công Sơn and rose to fame in the 1960s. She married South Vietnam journalist Nguyễn Hoàng Đoan in 1975.

Life and career

Early life
Khánh Ly was born to a traditional family and grew up in Hanoi. As a child, she would fall asleep to her father's soothing voice. His serenades planted inside her a love for music, which grew stronger every day against her family's wishes. In 1954, at the age of 9, she entered a small contest in the city of Hanoi singing Thơ Ngây; she did not win.

By 1956, she accompanied her mother to the southern regions of Vietnam. At the end of that very same year, she secretly entered a children's talent-search contest produced by Pháp-Á production at Norodom Stage in Saigon. Mai traveled to the contest by sneaking into the back of transport trucks and hitching a ride from Đà Lạt City to Saigon. She won second prize singing Pham Duy's famous song, Ngày Trở Về. Mai lost to child-star Quốc Thắng who would also later become an iconic figure in the music world. She was only 11.

1962–1966: Debut
Mai's musical career did not officially begin until she debuted at Club Anh Vũ on 43 Bùi Viện Street in Saigon when she was only 17 (1962). At this point, she adopted the stage name Khánh Ly, a combination of Khánh Kỵ and Yêu Ly, both are characters from Chronicles of the Eastern Zhou Kingdoms, her favorite novel. By the end of 1962, she relocated to Đà Lạt and stayed there for four years performing at various clubs and resorts. Night after night, she serenaded lovers, tourists, and the youths of Vietnam.
On a rainy night in 1964, she met Trịnh Công Sơn (TCS), at that time a young composer and a teacher at a school in Bảo Lộc. They became fast friends. Fascinated by her seductive voice, Trinh had asked her on several occasions to accompany him in his performances in Saigon. Still in love with the romantic hills of Da Lat, she declined.

1967–1975: Diva of Saigon
During a trip to Saigon in 1967, she ran into Trịnh on the busy streets of Lê Thánh Tôn. After several serenades and coffee at a small shop called Quán Văn, the legacy of Khánh Ly and Trịnh Công Sơn had begun.
Within the next several decades, Khánh Ly and Trịnh Công Sơn sang together at small coffee shops, clubs, and even on the steps of Văn Khoa University in Saigon (a liberal arts school). During the escalation of an unwanted and bloody war, his anti-war lyrics in the Yellow-Skin Songs and her luring voice appealed to those who grew weary of the battles and bloodshed; their plea for peace propelled them to the top. From the educating fields of large universities to the unknown and endless farm lands, she was heard, known, and hailed as "Nữ Hoàng Chân Đất" or "Nữ Hoàng Sân Cỏ." Together, Khánh Ly and Trịnh Công Sơn took the Vietnamese music world by storm. Their phenomenal fame gave her the chance to be the first Vietnamese woman to headline her own show. During the late 1960s to early 1970s, she also collaborated with multiple production companies and played a large part on the recorded tracks from famous videos such as the Phạm Mạnh Cương Program, Trường Sơn Centre, Sơn Ca Productions, Hoạ Mi, Jo Marcel Productions, etc.

Up until her emigration in 1975, Khánh Ly achieved unproportional fame around the world. She opened Club Khánh Ly on Tự Do Street in Saigon along with a small shop named Hội Quán Cây Tre, a gathering place for musicians and students alike. In addition, she was sponsored by the Vietnamese government to hold performances in Europe in order to promote the worldwide collaboration of the rising generation of Vietnamese students ("Nối Vòng Tay Lớn"). She also performed in the United States, Canada, and Japan at Osaka Fair in response to the invitation from Nippon Columbia Label (a large production company). Here, she recorded an album, featuring Trịnh Công Sơn's songs Diễm Xưa and Ca Dao Mẹ (sang in both languages), which went gold shortly after its debut. These songs became top hits in Japan and remained so for several decades. Khánh Ly was the first Vietnamese singer to achieve international fame.

1975–present: Continue career after The Fall of Saigon
In 1975, Khánh Ly, along with thousands of Vietnamese refugees, crossed the Pacific Ocean and settled in America. Like many, she struggled to find jobs on American soil to provide for her four children. Even though the first few years were difficult, Khánh Ly's renowned status did not fade from the music world. Within the late 1970s and throughout the 1980s, Khanh Ly was invited back to Japan on numerous occasions by Nippon Columbia Label, Toci Film, and Japanese largest television station to record and perform. Her second record with Nippon Columbia (1979) went gold short after its release; there were 2 million copies sold in Japan alone. Her third and final album with Nippon also featured classic hits such as Wandering Man. In addition, both Toci Film and Japanese largest television station featured her voice in the theme song to several movies and television series regarding Vietnam's culture as well as the "Boat People" phenomenon; her most notable recording was "Lời Ru Cho Đà Nẵng" in 1987, music by Japanese artist Hako and words by former newspaper editor and Khánh Ly's husband, Nguyễn Hoàng Đoan. She was also featured in the Asian Music Festival held in Japan along with famous singers from Korea, Hong Kong, Thailand, and the South Pacific. Her fame in Japan continued to escalate when she was named one of the top 10 most famous people along the same line as Gandhi, Gucci, Martin Luther King Jr.s wife, among others. In 1996, Japan's television station NKH and famous producer Hideo Kado produced a short 50-minute documentary about the life of Khánh Ly which aired on 29 April 1997, 22 years from the day she left Saigon. In September of that year, NKH also published a 270-page biography about Khánh Ly.

In the later part of the 1980s and early 1990s, Khánh Ly traveled vigorously and performed in Russia, the Czech Republic, Poland, and in a concert in East Germany after the Berlin Wall was taken down in 1989. Being a devout Catholic, she also sang at many church-sponsored events in which her most memorable performance was at the Canonization of 117 Vietnamese Priests in Vatican City (1988) where she met Pope John Paul II. In 1992, during the World's Youth Festival in Denver Colorado, Khánh Ly had the honor of meeting the Pope for a second time. In 1996, she, several other renowned singers, and songwriter Trầm Tử Thiêng hosted a Charity Concert in order to raise money to build houses/shelters for 2000 Vietnamese refugees in the Philippines. They raised 2 million dollars, enough to establish a Vietnamese Village on a small island off of the coast of the Philippines.

Now she is living comfortably with her husband, former newspaper editor/writer Nguyễn Hoàng Đoan in Cerritos, California, recording for Thúy Nga-Paris by Night, Asia, May Productions, etc., touring the world, and co-owns her own production company, Khánh Ly Productions, which has produced more than 30 CDs, 4 videos, and several DVDs to date. Aside from her paid performances, she is also writing weekly columns for various Vietnamese newspaper and magazines throughout the world (Hồn Việt, Văn Nghệ Tự Do, Văn Nghệ Magazine, Thời Báo, Báo Mai, etc.). Khánh Ly has also devoted the majority of her time to humanitarian acts and charitable organizations for Vietnamese orphans as well as Vietnamese refugees around the world.
For the past six decades, Khánh Ly has left a breathtaking legacy that she has written and is still writing for the next generation of Vietnam. She found music boldly, imprinted in history an irreplaceable voice that knows no parallel, and dazzled the world with her graceful, witty, and humble personality. For someone who is the voice of generations, she has only one simple wish:
"To breathe my last breath on the stage which gave me life...."
On 9 May 2014, she had her first concert in Vietnam National Convention Center, Hanoi, Vietnam at which she performed many famous songs of hers to thousands of fans.

Personal life
She was married the first time to Minh Di and had two children with him. Her second marriage was to Mai Bá Trạc, a soldier of South Vietnam and they had a daughter. After his death in 1975, Khánh Ly later married Nguyễn Hoàng Đoan, a Vietnamese journalist.

There were rumors about her love for musician Trịnh Công Sơn, but Trịnh Công Sơn denied it and said that they were just good friends.

In an interview reported by BBC, Khánh Ly said that she was not bothered by the Vietnamese Government's censorship of overseas songs because "singing songs that people don't allow will cause troubles", and "sometimes, what we like is not necessarily what others like".

Discography

Cassettes and CDs
1967 – Ghi âm trực tiếp tại Quán Văn (with Trịnh Công Sơn)
1969 – Hát cho quê hương Việt Nam 1 (performed Trịnh Công Sơn songs)
1970?- Nhạc Tuyển 1 (with Trịnh Công Sơn)
1970 – Hát cho quê hương Việt Nam 2 (performed Trịnh Công Sơn songs)
1971 – Băng nhạc Tình ca 1 (with Sĩ Phú, Duy Trác and Thanh Lan)
1971 – Hát cho quê hương Việt Nam 3 (performed Trịnh Công Sơn songs)
1971 – Tứ quý (with Lệ Thu, Duy Trác, and Tuấn Ngọc)
1973 – Hát cho quê hương Việt Nam 4 (performed Trịnh Công Sơn songs)
1973 – Như cánh vạc bay (performed Trịnh Công Sơn songs)
1974 – Hát cho quê hương Việt Nam 5 (performed Trịnh Công Sơn songs)
1974 – Sơn Ca 7 (performed Trịnh Công Sơn songs)
1976 – Khi tôi về
1976 – Như cánh vạc bay (performed Trịnh Công Sơn songs)
1976 – Giáng Sinh-Quê hương còn đó nỗi buồn. Khánh Ly, Sĩ Phú, Mai Hương
1976 – Hát cho quê hương Việt Nam 6 (Nhạc Tuyển 1 rerelease) (with Trịnh Công Sơn)
1977 – Hát cho những người ở lại
1977 – Tình ca mùa hạ
1979 – Người di tản buồn
1980 – Lời buồn thánh (performed Trịnh Công Sơn songs)
1981 – Đừng yêu tôi (performed Vũ Thành An songs)
1981 – Giọt lệ cho ngàn sau (performed Từ Công Phụng songs)
1981 – Bông hồng cho người ngã ngựa
1981 – Tủi nhục ca. Khánh Ly (performed Hà Thúc Sinh songs)
1982 – Tắm mát ngọn sông đào
1983 – Ướt mi (performed Trịnh Công Sơn songs)
1983 – Bản tango cuối cùng
1984 – Trong tay anh đêm nay, Dạ vũ Valse
1984 – Lá đổ muôn chiều (Tà áo xanh) (performed Đoàn Chuẩn songs)
1984 – Bài tango cho em
1985 – Khối tình Trương Chi (with Sĩ Phú)
1985 – Biển nhớ (performed Trịnh Công Sơn songs)
1985 – Bông bưởi chiều xưa (performed Châu Đình An songs)
1986 – Hạ trắng (performed Trịnh Công Sơn songs)
1986 – Niệm khúc cuối (with Elvis Phương)
1986 – Thương một người
1986 – Tango tango
1987 – Tình không biên giới
1987 – Ai trở về xứ Việt
1987 – Bên ni bên nớ (performed Phạm Duy songs)
1987 – Như cánh vạc bay (with Lệ Thu)
1987 – Đêm hạ hồng (with Lệ Thu and Thanh Phong)
1988 – Boston buồn
1988 – Tango điên (Vũ nữ thân gầy)
1989 – Kinh khổ (performed Trầm Tử Thiêng songs)
1989 – Mưa hồng
1989 – Đêm hạnh ngộ
1989 – Niệm khúc hoa vàng
1989 – Xóa tên người tình (with Elvis Phương)
1990 – Tình nhớ (performed Trịnh Công Sơn songs)
1990 – Tình hờ (with Elvis Phương)
1991 – Vũng lầy của chúng ta (performed Lê Uyên Phương songs)
1991 – Tưởng rằng đã quên
1991 – Lệ đá (with Lệ Thu and Kim Anh)
1991 – Best of Khánh Ly
1992 – Ca dao mẹ
1992 – Bên đời hiu quạnh (performed Trịnh Công Sơn songs)
1992 – Một cõi đi về (Im lặng thở dài) (performed Trịnh Công Sơn songs)
1993 – Dốc mơ
1993 – Tôi ơi đừng tuyệt vọng. Tiếng hát Khánh Ly, Trịnh Công Sơn và Trịnh Vĩnh Trinh
1994 – Để lại cho em (performed Phạm Duy songs)
1994 – Em còn nhớ hay em đã quên (tái bản từ Bông hồng cho người ngã ngựa)
1994 – Ừ thôi em về (Shotguns record collection từ '70 rerelease)
1995 – Đời vẫn hát
1996 – Ca khúc da vàng, Volume 1 (performed Trịnh Công Sơn songs)
1997 – Mùa thu xa em: Khánh Ly đặc biệt
1998 – Ca khúc da vàng, Volume 2 (performed Trịnh Công Sơn songs)
1999 – Ca khúc da vàng, Volume 3 (performed Trịnh Công Sơn songs)
1999 – Hiên cúc vàng (performed Nguyễn Đình Toàn songs)
1999 – Nguyệt ca (performed Trịnh Công Sơn songs)
2000 – Đời cho ta thế (performed Trịnh Công Sơn songs)
2000 – Tình thu trên cao (performed Nguyễn Xuân Điềm songs)
2001 – Một sớm mai về (performed Trầm Tử Thiêng songs)
2002 – Nếu có yêu tôi
2002 – Mưa trên cây hoàng lan (performed Nguyễn Đình Toàn songs)
2003 – Còn tuổi nào cho em (performed Trịnh Công Sơn songs)
2005 – Ca khúc da vàng, Volume 4 (performed Trịnh Công Sơn songs)
2008 – TangoGoTango
2009 – Như một vết thương (performed Trịnh Công Sơn songs)
2011 – Nụ cười trăm năm (performed Trần Dạ Từ songs)
2011 – Chưa phai (thơ Cẩm Vân phổ nhạc)

DVDs
1982 – Khánh Ly in Japan
1988 – Ai Trở Về Xứ Việt
1991 – Một Đời Việt Nam
2005 – Thuở Ấy Mưa Hồng
2012 – Thánh ca dâng Mẹ

External links
 Khanh-Ly.com Official website of Khanh Ly
 Khánh Ly in the Vietnamese Music Database

References

Articles needing translation from Vietnamese Wikipedia
1945 births
Living people
People from Hanoi
People from Da Lat
Vietnamese women singers
Vietnamese Roman Catholics
Vietnamese emigrants to the United States
American people of Vietnamese descent
Singers of Vietnamese descent